Microeca is a genus of passerine birds in the Australasian robin family Petroicidae. The species in this genus are commonly known as flyrobins (along with the closely related torrent flyrobin).

Species
The genus contains three species:

Several other species were formerly placed in this genus:
 Yellow-bellied flyrobin or yellow-bellied robin (Microeca flaviventris)
 Olive flyrobin (Microeca flavovirescens)
 Yellow-legged flyrobin or yellow-legged flycatcher (Microeca griseoceps)
 Canary flyrobin or Papuan flycatcher (Microeca papuana)

References

 Del Hoyo, J.; Elliot, A. & Christie D. (editors). (2007). Handbook of the Birds of the World. Volume 12: Picathartes to Tits and Chickadees. Lynx Edicions.

External links
 Lemon-bellied Flyrobin at The Internet Bird Collection

 
Petroicidae
Bird genera
Taxonomy articles created by Polbot